Covoada is a settlement in the northern part of the island of São Nicolau, Cape Verde. It is situated 7 km northwest of Ribeira Brava.

See also
List of villages and settlements in Cape Verde

References

Villages and settlements in São Nicolau, Cape Verde
Ribeira Brava, Cape Verde